The International Bear Brotherhood Flag, also known as the bear flag, is a pride flag designed to represent the bear subculture within the LGBTQIA+ community. The colors of the flag—dark brown, orange/rust, golden yellow, tan, white, gray, and black—are meant to include the colors of the furs of animal bears throughout the world. Though not necessarily referring to human skin color or hair color, the flag was designed with inclusion in mind. The bear culture celebrates secondary sex characteristics such as growth of body hair and facial hair, traits associated with bears.

Background
Craig Byrnes created the bear flag in 1995. Byrnes' undergraduate degree in psychology involved designing a senior project about the bear culture that has exploded since the early 1980s, of which he had first-hand experience. He thought it might be fitting to design a flag that would best represent the bear community and include it with the results of his research. To do this, he received help from another influential member of the bear cultural community. Four variations were sewing machine-constructed and Byrnes won approval to display the four  prototype flags at the Chesapeake Bay "Bears of Summer" events in July 1995. 

The winning design (a version created by Paul Witzkoske) is a field of simple horizontal stripes with a paw print in the upper left corner — a layout similar to the Leather flag. The colors represent the fur colors and nationalities of bears throughout the world and the flag was designed with inclusivity in mind. It is trademarked.

Gallery

Further reading

References

Flag
LGBT flags
Flags introduced in 1995
Sexuality flags